Halid Genjac (born 8 March 1958) is a Bosnian politician who served as the 2nd Bosniak member of the Presidency of Bosnia and Herzegovina from 2000 to 2001. 

He is the current general secretary of the Party of Democratic Action. Genjac has also been a long time member of both houses of the Parliamentary Assembly of Bosnia and Herzegovina.

Early life and education
Born in Visoko, PR Bosnia and Herzegovina, FPR Yugoslavia on 8 March 1958, Genjac finished primary school in Lower Moštre and high school in 1975 in Visoko. He graduated from the Faculty of Medicine in Tuzla in 1981.

Early career
After graduating, Genjac was employed at a health center in Travnik, and in 1990 he specialized in gynaecologic cytology in Zagreb. The same year, Genjac returned to the Travnik health center, where he became the head of the Women's Health Protection Service, and in 1992, the director of the health center. He worked as director until 1995, after which he began his political career

Political career
Genjac has been a member of the Party of Democratic Action (SDA) since its foundation in 1990. He was first the president of the party's main board, but then on 24 March 2018, he was elected general secretary of the SDA, succeeding Amir Zukić.

In the first post-war election in 1996, Genjac was elected to the House of Representatives of the Parliamentary Assembly of Bosnia and Herzegovina, and until 2000, he was also a member of its leadership.

At the 2000 parliamentary election, he was again a candidate for the House of Representatives, but did not win enough votes, so Genjac was appointed as a member of the national House of Peoples. The same year however, Alija Izetbegović, the first Chairman of the Presidency of Bosnia and Herzegovina, withdrew from the Bosnian Presidency, and so Genjac took his place, serving in office until 30 March 2001.

At the 2002 general election, Genjac failed to win a seat in the national House of Representatives, but he was re-appointed as a member in the House of Peoples. At the 2006 general election, Genjac was once again elected to the House of Representatives, but four years later though, at the 2010 general election he did not succeed, so he was appointed member of the House of Peoples for a third time. After the 2014 general election, he remained as member of the House of Peoples. Since October 2018, Genjac has been a member of the national House of Representatives.

Personal life
Halid is married to Sadika Genjac and together they have three children. They live in Sarajevo.

References

External links

Website of the Presidency

1958 births
Living people
People from Visoko
Bosniaks of Bosnia and Herzegovina
Party of Democratic Action politicians
Members of the Presidency of Bosnia and Herzegovina